James William Montgomery Bradshaw (23 November 1906 – 5 December 1938) was an English cricketer. Bradshaw was a left-handed batsman who was a right-arm bowler, although his bowling style is unknown. He was born in Oakham, Rutland.

He made his first-class debut for Leicestershire against Sir J Cahn's XI in 1935. He made 2 further first-class appearances, against Sir L Parkinson's XI in 1935 and Oxford University in 1938.  In his 3 matches, he scored 95 runs at an average of 31.66, with a high score of 82. This score came in his debut match against Sir J Cahn's XI.  He also took a single wicket, that of Oxford University batsman John Guy.

His cousins, James Bradshaw and Walter Bradshaw, both played first-class cricket for Leicestershire. Bradshaw died in the town of his birth on 5 December 1938.

References

External links

1906 births
1938 deaths
People from Oakham
English cricketers
Leicestershire cricketers
Cricketers from Rutland